Joseph Ngoua (12 May 1923 – August 1999) was Ambassador of Gabon to the U.S. in 1961 and Gabon's foreign minister in 1963 to 1964.

References

1923 births
1999 deaths
Foreign ministers of Gabon
Ambassadors of Gabon to the United States